Ram Deo Ram (born 7 January 1937 in Garhi, Palamau district) is an Indian politician and member of the Bharatiya Janata Party. Ram was a first term member of the Lok Sabha in 1991 from the  Palamu constituency in Palamau, Jharkhand.

He was elected to Bihar Legislative Assembly in 1967–69, 1977 & 1990. He was secretary of Jan Sangh he has four brouther  
Elder one (kauleshwar ram)older is (bhashdev ram) and (shivsankar ram)

References 

1937 births
Living people
People from Palamu district
Bharatiya Jana Sangh politicians
India MPs 1991–1996
Bharatiya Janata Party politicians from Bihar
Bharatiya Janata Party politicians from Jharkhand
Members of the Bihar Legislative Assembly
Lok Sabha members from Jharkhand